This is the discography of American rapper, Mac Dre.

Albums

Studio albums
Young Black Brotha (1993)
Stupid Doo Doo Dumb (1998)
Rapper Gone Bad (1999)
Heart of a Gangsta, Mind of a Hustla, Tongue of a Pimp (2000)
Mac Dre's the Name (2001)
It's Not What You Say... It's How You Say It (2001)
Thizzelle Washington (2002)
Al Boo Boo (2003)
Ronald Dregan: Dreganomics (2004)
The Genie of the Lamp (2004)
The Game Is Thick, Vol. 2 (2004)

Posthumous studio albums
Pill Clinton (2007)
Dre Day: July 5th 1970 (2008)

Collaboration albums
Supa Sig Tapes with Little Bruce (1990)
Turf Buccaneers with Cutthoat Committee (2001)
Money iz Motive with Cutthoat Committee (2005)
Da U.S. Open with Mac Mall (2005)
A Tale of Two Andres with Andre Nickatina (2008)

Compilation albums
Don't Hate the Player, Hate the Game (1998)
The Best of Mac Dre (2002)
The Best of Mac Dre II (2004)
The Best of Mac Dre Vol. 3 (2006)
Everybody Ain't Able with Jay Tee (2007)
The Best of Mac Dre Vol. 4 (2008)
The Best of Mac Dre Vol. 5 (2010)

Other albums
2001: Mac Dammit Man & Friends: City Slickers
2002: Do You Remember?
2005: Judge Dre Mathis 
2006: 16 Wit Dre (with DJ Backside)
2006: 16 Wit Dre, Vol. 2 (with DJ Backside)
2006: Tales of II Andres (with Andre Nickatina)
2006: Uncut
2007: Starters in the Game
2007: DreDiggs: Me & My Cuddie (with J-Diggs)
2008: The Dre Area
2008: What it Thizz
2008: For the Streets (14 Unreleased Tracks)
2009: Maccin' & Doggin''' (with Da'unda'dogg)

Compilations, mixtapes & bootlegs
1996: Mac Dre Presents: The Rompalation Vol.11998: Don't Hate the Player, Hate the Game (Mac Dre in the Mix)1999: Mac Dre Brings You: The Rompalation II: An Overdose2002: Mac Dre Presents: The Rompalation III2004: The Appearances (Special Guest Appearances)2004: Treal T.V. (The Soundtrack)2005: Welcome to Thizz World (Hosted by DJ Rick Lee)2005: Don't Hate the Player, Hate the Game #2 (Hosted by DJ Rick Lee)2005: 23109: Exhibition of Speed Soundtrack2006: Tales of II Andre's - 100% Authentic Unreleased Tracks (with Andre Nickatina)
2006: Treal T.V. (Soundtrack #2)2007: Official Tribute - Collectors Edition (Hosted by DJ Rick Lee)2007: The Best of Mac Dammit & Friends2007: Don't Hate the Player, Hate the Game #3 (Hosted by Chuy Gomez)2008: Don't Hate the Player, Hate the Game #4 (Hosted by DJ Vlad)2008: Tha Furley Ghost Compilation2008: Welcome to Thizz World Volume 2.1 (Hosted by DJ Rick Lee)2008: Welcome to Thizz World Volume 2.2 (Hosted by DJ Rick Lee)2010: G.A.M.E.Unreleased
1989: Cold Cold Capper (EP)
2003: The Supa Sig Tapes (with Little Bruce)

Extended playsYoung Black Brotha (1989)California Livin' (1991)What's Really Going On (1992)Back n da Hood (1992)

Videos
Music videos
1993: "California Livin'"  (featuring Coolio Da Unda Dogg) 
1999: "Rapper Gone Bad"
1999: "Fire"

MoviesTreal TV 1 (2002)Legend of the Bay: The Mac Dre Documentary'' (2015)

References 

 

Hip hop discographies
Discographies of American artists